Bish is the second album by singer/songwriter Stephen Bishop. The lead single, "Everybody Needs Love", peaked at No. 32 on the Billboard Hot 100 singles chart. and number five on the U.S. Adult Contemporary chart. It did better in Canada, reaching No. 29 and peaking at number two on the Canadian Adult Contemporary chart.  The album itself rose to No. 35 on the Billboard pop albums chart.

Notable contributors to the album include Art Garfunkel, Chaka Khan, Natalie Cole and Michael McDonald. At the end of the track "Vagabond from Heaven", a large group, "The Whistling Bishettes", is heard. The group includes several famous non-musicians: actress Carrie Fisher, film director John Landis and then-Rolling Stone writer Cameron Crowe.

"Looking for the Right One"
"Looking for the Right One" was the second single from Bish.  It was released in both Canada and the UK, but it did not chart. Three years earlier, Art Garfunkel had recorded the song.  His original rendition  of Bishop's composition was included as the B-side of his 1975 cover hit, "I Only Have Eyes For You" (U.S. #18, #1 AC).  Bishop contributed backing vocals on Garfunkel's version, who returned the favor on Bishop's rendition.

Track listing
All songs written by Stephen Bishop, except where noted.

Personnel 
Musicians
 Stephen Bishop – lead vocals, acoustic guitar (1–5, 9–13), trombone (1)
 Greg Phillinganes – synthesizers (1, 4, 8), electric piano (4)
 David Foster – electric piano (2), acoustic piano (3)
 John Barlow Jarvis – electric piano (3), acoustic piano (4, 6)
 Bill Payne – electric piano (6, 8)
 Bobby Chadwick – piano
 Steve Porcaro – synthesizers (7, 10, 12)
 Ray Parker Jr. – guitars (4)
 Michael Sembello – guitars (4)
 Steve Cropper – guitars (6)
 Jeffrey Staton – guitars (8–11), electric guitar solo (8, 12)
 Michael Staton – guitars (8–11)
 Ray Brown – bass (1)
 David Hungate – bass (2, 3, 6, 8)
 Nathan Watts – bass (4)
 David Shields – bass (8)
 Leland Sklar – bass (10)
 Keith Hollar – bass (12)
 Abraham Laboriel – bass (13)
 Ed Shaughnessy – drums (1)
 Rick Shlosser – drums (2, 3, 6, 8, 9)
 Raymond Pounds – drums (4)
 Hal Atkinson – drums (8, 12)
 Paulinho da Costa – percussion (4)
 Tommy Vig – percussion (9)
 Tom Scott – saxophones (12), horn arrangements (12)
 Artie Butler – string arrangements and conductor (1, 7, 11)
 Marty Paich – string arrangements and conductor (3, 13)
 Gene Page – rhythm arrangements (4), string arrangements and conductor (8)

Backing vocals
 Stephen Bishop
 Michael McDonald (2, 8)
 Leah Kunkel (4)
 Jeffrey Staton (4, 8, 9)
 Michael Staton (4, 8)
 Natalie Cole (6)
 Chaka Khan (6)
 The James Lee Hoosett Choir  (7)
 Art Garfunkel (10)

"The Whistling Bishettes" on "Vagabond from Heaven"
 Nancy Ames, Philip Ames, Michael Barackman, Dennis Bishop, Kathy Carey, Cameron Crowe, Kenny Farrell, Carrie Fisher, Mary Frampton, Richard Green, Trudy Green, John Landis, Mark Meyerson, Spencer Proffer, Michael J. Sheehy, James Lee Stanley, Jeffrey Staton, Michael Staton and Michael Whitney

Production 
 Produced by Stephen Bishop
 Co-produced by Dee Robb
 Executive Producer – Pat Lawrence
 Engineered by Joe Robb and Dee Robb
 Assistant Engineers – Joe Chiccarelli, Anthony D'Amico, Steve Gursky, Steve Katz, Richard Leech, Kevin Ryan and George Tutko.
 Mixed by Jerry Masters
 Mastered by Ted Jensen at Sterling Sound (New York, NY).
 Production Coordination and Art Direction – Michelle Horie
 Design – Matthew Bitton
 Photography – David Alexander

Reception
Rolling Stone's Ken Tucker wrote, "Stephen Bishop's second album is so ambitious and self-assured that it's easy to overlook the chances it takes." Adding that its "mixture of sentiment and aggressiveness... makes it so intriguing a pop disc." Concluding that "Stephen Bishop is well on his way, and he possesses something all his exemplars lack: a serenely nutty sense of humor."

References

1978 albums
Stephen Bishop (singer) albums
Albums arranged by Gene Page
Albums arranged by Marty Paich
ABC Records albums